Bowden Névé is a névé in Antarctica about  wide, lying southward of Mount Miller between the Queen Elizabeth Range and the Queen Alexandra Range. It was observed in 1958 by the New Zealand Southern Party of the Commonwealth Trans-Antarctic Expedition (CTAE) (1956–58) and named for Charles M. Bowden, Chairman of the Ross Sea Committee which organized the New Zealand party of the CTAE.

References 

Snow fields of the Ross Dependency
Shackleton Coast
Névés of Antarctica